Bagnols may refer to various communes in France:

 Bagnols, Puy-de-Dôme
 Bagnols, Rhône
 Bagnols-en-Forêt, Var
 Bagnols-les-Bains, Lozère
 Bagnols-sur-Cèze, Gard